Down the Stretch may refer to:
 Down the Stretch (1936 film), an American drama film
 Down the Stretch (1927 film), an American drama film